North Carolina Highway 9 (NC 9) is a  primary state highway in the U.S. state of North Carolina. It serves as a connector route from South Carolina Highway 9 to eastern portions of the Appalachians around Asheville.

Route description
NC 9 meets SC 9 at the state border. SC 9 is one of South Carolina's most important state highways, although it is less so in North Carolina. NC 9 begins in Polk County south of the Green Creek community.

NC 9 is co-signed with US 64/74A in the city of Lake Lure.

After crossing into Buncombe County NC 9 crosses over the Eastern Continental Divide at Lakey Gap and crosses I-40 at exit 64.

The  stretch of NC 9 from Bat Cave north to Black Mountain has been designated as a North Carolina Scenic Highway.  It is known as The Sidewinder in the motorcycle community, many scenic and curvy roads in the NC mountains have nicknames, as well. In addition to the scenery, it is a hilly and twisty route with some steep grades. A sign heading south from Black Mountain points out that heavy trucks are prohibited.

The highway runs through the town of Black Mountain ( east of Asheville). Nearly  after crossing I-40, NC 9 ends at the vaulted archway entrance to the town of Montreat.

History

1930-1937: There was a previous NC 9 before the current day routing and was known as Leesville Road. The first 9 dates from about 1930, and ran from Raleigh northwest to Durham. Today, part of that road is U.S. 70. It ran in conjunction with US 15A through downtown Raleigh in front of the Capitol Building. The original NC 9 lasted until late 1937, when it was renumbered as US 70A.

1938: NC 9 in Raleigh is renumbered, while NC 192 is renumbered to NC 9 from the SC Border to Lake Lure, and renumbering NC 119 from Chimney Rock Park (just north of Lake Lure) area north to Montreat. The number was chosen because of the SC 9 renumbering in early 1938.

1972: An I-40-related rerouting just south of downtown Black Mountain in 1972. In the years before the Interstate was built 9 entered town along Black Mountain Avenue, proceeding east onto Sutton Avenue before continuing north on Broadway Street. With the completion of I-40, NC 9 followed an extension of Broadway Street. This is the last major change.

North Carolina Highway 192 (1928-1937)

The first North Carolina Highway 192 (NC 192) was established as a new primary routing between NC 19, in Mill Spring, and US 74/NC 20, in Lake Lure. In 1931, NC 192 was extended southeast from Mill Spring along new primary routing to the South Carolina state line, where it continued as SC 177 towards Spartanburg. In late 1937, part of the renumbering effort for contiguous routes with South Carolina, NC 192 was redesignated as NC 9 to match SC 9, which replaced SC 177 the year prior.

Major intersections

References

External links

NC 9 Info

009
Transportation in Polk County, North Carolina
Transportation in Rutherford County, North Carolina
Transportation in Henderson County, North Carolina
Transportation in Buncombe County, North Carolina
U.S. Route 70